The Lions Football Club is an association football club based in the Philippines.

History
Lions F.C. was established on 7 December 1949 by football coach Mariano Ong.

In the 1950s, the Lions dominated other Filipino-Chinese football clubs such as Cheng Hua, Cheng Hong, Electrons, and South Star in local leagues and was composed mostly of players from the Mapua. The Lions won the Manila Football League seven times.

They participated in the Asian Champion Club Tournament (now known as the AFC Champions League) held in Bangkok, Thailand, in 1969, where they finished last in Group A of the group stage.

Honors

Domestic competitions

National championship
Winners (1): 1967

Manila Football League
Winners (7): 1955, 1956, 1957, 1958, 1959, 1960, 1961

References 

Football clubs in the Philippines
Association football clubs established in 1949
1949 establishments in the Philippines
Sports teams in Metro Manila